Andrzej Stanisław Bogusławski (born 1 December 1931) is a Polish philologist, semanticist, semioticist and philosopher of language of international repute. Originally a specialist in Russian language, his interests broadened into the epistemology of language and linguistics.

During martial law in Poland he was interned for refusing to sign an oath of loyalty which led to international protests. He is a professor emeritus at Warsaw University.

Career
His early work focused on Russian language and moved later to the theory of language. He became a member of the Polish Academy of Sciences philology committee, a member of the Warsaw Scientific Society, a national member of the Polish Academy of Learning, and for many years director of the faculty of Formal Linguistics at Warsaw University.

Political internment 
On 13 December 1981 he was arrested and interned by the Polish authorities for refusing to sign an oath of loyalty. Noam Chomsky, among other academics, called for his release. He was released on 16 July 1982.

Research 
Bogusławski's research interests have ranged from lexicography, through grammar, semantics, semiotics to formal logic and the roots of language in philosophy and theology. He collaborated with Anna Wierzbicka on Natural semantic metalanguage research and is credited by her with reviving the notion of Leibniz's "alphabet of human thought", or Lingua Mentalis. Bogusławski is an acknowledged authority in the field of the theory of language and research methodology in the sphere of Indo-European languages, especially Slavic languages. His interests also take in semantics, lexicology, lexicography, pragmatics, syntax, inflection, neologism phonology, theories of text and translation, semiotics and the theory of literature.

He has made original contributions to the methodology of semantics and to the theoretical bases of synchronistic morphology, lexicology, lexicography. In the 1960s he hypothesised the emergence of natural language generation with the aid of elementary linguistic units. In the 1970s he postulated a theory of operational grammar, relating linguistic elements to syntax. This helped to advance understanding of how the fields of internal languages are demarcated and he assisted the development of the empirical study of linguistics. He laid down the methodological basis of contemporary synchronous lexicography. He has also explored the frontiers of language and philosophy.

Honours 
 In 2001 he was honoured with a Festschrift on the occasion of his 70th birthday.
 In 2003 he was awarded the Commander's Cross with Star of the Order of Polonia Restituta.
 On 16 May 2012 Andrzej Bogusławski was awarded an Honorary doctorate by the University of Torun.

Works 
Bogusławski is the author of over 400 publications and the editor of the Polish-Russian and Russian-Polish dictionary. He has published in Polish, Russian and English.

Selected books 
 Bogusławski, Andrzej (2010). Dwa studia z teorii fleksji (i inne przyczynki). Warsaw: Bel Studio. . 
 Bogusławski, Andrzej (2007). A study in the linguistics-philosophy interface. Warsaw: BEL Studio. . http://bc.klf.uw.edu.pl/36/.
 Fleksja rosyjska, Warsaw 2005.
 Aspekt i negacja, Warsaw 20031, 20042.
 Science as Linguistic Activity, Linguistics as Scientific Activity, Warszawa 1998.
 Sprawy słowa = Word matters, Warsaw 1994.
 Two Essays on Inflection, Warsaw 1992.
 Język w słowniku : desiderata semantyczne do wielkiego słownika polszczyzny, Wrocław 1988.
 Ilustrowany słownik rosyjsko-polski, polsko-rosyjski, t. 1–2, Warsaw 19781, 19832, 19863, 19934.
 Problems of the Thematic-Rhematic Structure of Sentences, Warsaw 1977.
 Semantyczne pojęcie liczebnika i jego morfologia w języku rosyjskim, Wrocław 1966.

Selected articles 
 Rezygnacja i nadzieja filozofów, „Przegląd Humanistyczny” 2004 Nr 383, p. 1-26.
 A note on Apresjan`s concept of "Polish school of semantics" with an appendix, „Lingua Posnaniensis” 2003 Tom XLV, p. 7-18.
 Jeszcze o wiedzy i wszechwiedzy, „Przegląd Humanistyczny” 2002 Tom 3, p. 67-73.
 Reflections on Wierzbicka`s explications, „Lingua Posnaniensis” 2001 Tom XLIII, p. 47-88.
 On the necessity of necessity, „Lingua Posnaniensis” 2001 Tom XLIII, p. 39-45.
 O pozytywnej stronie granic poznania, in U progu trzeciego tysiąclecia. Człowiek - Nauka - Wiara, Warsaw 2000, pp. 209–245.
 Człowiek współczesny: rozum i wiara, in U progu trzeciego tysiąclecia. Człowiek - Nauka - Wiara, Warsaw 2000, pp. 524–536.

See also
Polish Linguists

References

Bibliography

External links 
 biography of Andrzej Bogusławski at Nicolas Copernicus University
 NSM bibliography page at University of New England, Australia

1931 births
Living people
Etymologists
Linguists from Poland
Polish lexicographers
Linguistic turn
Members of the Polish Academy of Sciences
Philosophers of language
Polish educators
Polish non-fiction writers
Polish male non-fiction writers
Polish philologists
Polish translators
Polish writers
20th-century linguists
Semanticists
Linguists of Indo-European languages
Semioticians
Structuralists
People from Warsaw
Polish dissidents
Academic staff of Nicolaus Copernicus University in Toruń
University of Warsaw alumni
Academic staff of the University of Warsaw
Commanders of the Order of Polonia Restituta